El Omr Mashi is the second album of songs recorded by the Super Star winner Diana Karazon.

See also
SuperStar
Jordanian music

2005 albums
Diana Karazon albums
Arabic-language albums